Florida Area is a neighborhood of the city of New Orleans.  A subdistrict of the Bywater District Area, its boundaries as defined by the City Planning Commission are: Florida Boulevard, Gallier, Law, Congress and North Dorgenois Streets to the north; Mazant Street to the east; North Galvez Street to the south; and Montegut Street, Law Street, and Almonaster Avenue to the west.

Geography

Adjacent neighborhoods
 Desire Area (north)
 Florida Projects (north)
 Bywater (east)
 St. Claude (south)
 St. Roch (west)

Boundaries
The City Planning Commission defines the boundaries of Florida Area as these streets: Florida Boulevard, Gallier Street, Congress Street, North Dorgenois Street, Mazant Street, North Galvez Street, Montegut Street, Law Street and Almonaster Avenue.

Demographics
As of the census of 2000, there were 3,171 people, 1,189 households, and 823 families residing in the neighborhood.  The population density was 10,229 /mi2 (3,964 /km2).

As of the census of 2010, there were 1,302 people, 507 households, and 331 families residing in the neighborhood.

See also
 Neighborhoods in New Orleans

References

Neighborhoods in New Orleans